Příbramská strojírna a slévárna was a Czech automobile manufacturer, a successor to the Stelka.

History
The company was founded in Příbram. It started producing automobiles in 1924 under the brand name, ASPA. Production ended in 1929.

Vehicles
The first model was powered by the four-cylinder engine of the Ford Model T. Another model, referred to as Type B 5/15 HP, 5/14 HP or Type B depending on the source, had a water-cooled four-cylinder engine with 1327cc displacement and an output of 15 hp. The engine had OHV valve timing, magneto ignition, a Bosch starter and a four-speed gearbox. The engine drove the rear wheels and weighted 650 kg. The open four-seater had only one door. 40 examples of this model were produced. Delivery vans and ambulances were also offered.

In 1926, the M 7/24 HP was introduced. Powered by a four-cylinder engine with 75 mm bore and 110 mm stroke and a displacement of 1944cc.

In 1933, 30 passenger cars, 4 vans, 1 bus and 1 ambulance of this manufacturer were registered in Czechoslovakia.

Literature 
 Harald H. Linz, Halwart Schrader: Die Internationale Automobil-Enzyklopädie. United Soft Media Verlag, Munich 2008, ISBN 978-3-8032-9876-8. (German)
 George Nicholas Georgano (Editor-in-chief.): The Beaulieu Encyclopedia of the Automobile. Band 1: A–F. Fitzroy Dearborn Publishers, Chicago 2001, ISBN 1-57958-293-1. (English).
 Marián Šuman-Hreblay: Encyklopedie automobilů. České a slovenské osobní automobily od roku 1815 do současnosti. Computer Press, Brünn 2007, ISBN 978-80-251-1587-9. (Czech)

References 

Motor vehicle manufacturers of Czechoslovakia
Defunct motor vehicle manufacturers of Czechoslovakia
Vehicle manufacturing companies established in 1924
Vehicle manufacturing companies disestablished in 1929